Woldemichael Abraha was the fourth Minister of Transport and Communications for Eritrea starting in 2004. He was appointed Minister of Local Government after Woldemichael Gebremariam died in 2013. According to Eritrean government convention, Abraha – as minister of Local Government – serves as head of state when the President is away.

References

External links
 "For safe and efficient road transport service"
 photograph of Woldemichael Abraha

Year of birth missing (living people)
Living people
Government ministers of Eritrea
People's Front for Democracy and Justice politicians